Freakyforms: Your Creations, Alive!, known in Japan as , is a video game developed by Asobism and published by Nintendo for the Nintendo 3DS handheld system. Released via the Nintendo eShop store in 2011, Freakyforms lets players create their own characters, named "Formees", for use in the game. 

An expanded edition, Freakyforms Deluxe: Your Creations, Alive!, was released in 2012 both digitally and in retail. The game received generally mixed reviews from critics.

Gameplay 

In Freakyforms, players must first create an on-screen character, known as a "Formee". Formees are created using various shapes placed however the player decides. After the character is completed, players use the touch screen to navigate the character throughout the game world. As the player explores, they are asked to complete assigned tasks within a given time limit, such as collecting a number of items or assisting other characters. With continued play, additional features are unlocked, such as using the handheld's augmented reality features to take pictures of their creations in a real-world setting. Users may share their Freakyforms content by using the Nintendo 3DS system's StreetPass feature or by creating QR codes that can be scanned using the system's outer cameras.

Deluxe edition 
An enhanced retail version of the game titled Freakyforms Deluxe: Your Creations, Alive! launched in Europe on July 28, 2012, and in North America on November 5, 2012. This new version adds features such as the multiplayer mode where players make Formees together and explore dungeons. The software was released as a digital download on Nintendo eShop in Europe on August 17 and in Australia on September 13, while the original Freakyforms software was removed the day before. The original game was also replaced with the Deluxe edition in the North American eShop on the day the Deluxe edition was released. The game was also released in Japan as a Nintendo eShop-only game titled  on April 10, 2013, while the original Freakyforms software was removed the day before.

In June 2016, a homebrew exploit (Freakyhax) was released that is exclusive to the deluxe edition of the game. The exploit allows users to run unsigned software and code such as the Homebrew Launcher via the game's QR code features. As a result, the game can no longer be purchased on the 3DS eShop in all regions, although it is still available to redownload for anyone who purchased the game before the game was removed from the store. As of system version 11.1.0-X, the game is loaded in a PASLR (physical address space layout randomization) mode, and this temporarily broke the exploit. However, an updated version of the exploit that worked even when the game was loaded in PASLR mode was released on September 16, 2017.

Reception

Freakyforms: Your Creations, Alive! 

The original Freakyforms received "average" reviews according to the review aggregation website Metacritic. Lucas Thomas of IGN said that while the game's creation functions are "fairly well done", the developers then "surrounded it with this weird, tossed-together collection of desperate ideas that don't ever really feel like a cohesive game." In Nintendo Lifes review, Thomas Whitehead said Freakyforms was "a title that can give hours of childish pleasure", even though "repetitive exploration segments and control issues are negatives for anyone."

Freakyforms Deluxe 

Freakyforms Deluxe received a bit more mixed reviews than the original according to Metacritic.

References

External links 
Freakyforms: Your Creations, Alive! at Nintendo.com
Freakyforms Deluxe: Your Creations, Alive! at Nintendo.com

2011 video games
Multiplayer and single-player video games
Nintendo games
Nintendo 3DS games
Nintendo 3DS eShop games
Nintendo 3DS-only games
Nintendo Network games
Side-scrolling platform games
Video games developed in Japan
Video games produced by Kensuke Tanabe
Video games with user-generated gameplay content